Katovice is a market town in Strakonice District in the South Bohemian Region of the Czech Republic. It has about 1,300 inhabitants.

Geography
It lies on the border of the České Budějovice Basin and Blatná Uplands. The area of the hill is protected as the Kněží hora Nature Reserve.

The market town is situated on the Otava River, in the historical Prácheňsko region.

History

Katovice was founded in the 9th or 10th century, probably as a Slavic gold panning settlement on the Otava River and later a market settlement. The first written mention of Katovice is from 1045, when Duke Bretislav I donated the settlement to the Břevnov Monastery. Since then Katovice was mainly an agricultural village.

From the 13th century, Katovice was a serfdom village of the Střela castle. In 1505, Katovice was mentioned as a market town for the first time.

In the 19th century, Katovice slowly developed. It was still an agricultural settlement; other sources of livelihood were pearl hunting and the floating of wood in the form of rafts. In 1867, the railroad from Vienna to Cheb was built and helped industrialize Katovice. From 1913 until 1922, graphite was extracted from the steep hill of Kněží hora.

Before the end of World War II, on 20 April 1945, American fighting jets attacked a train carrying concentration camp prisoners that stopped at local railway station. More than 200 prisoners managed to run away. However, few of them were consequently tracked down by the SS men and killed instantly.

Demographics

Sport
Local football team SK Otava Katovice participates in South Bohemian Regional Championship (4th tier of the Czech football system).

Sights
The main landmark is the Church of Saints Philip and James. Originally built in the Romanesque style, it was rebuilt to its current form in 1587.

Notable people
Václav Matějka (born 1937), film director and screenwriter

References

External links

Market towns in the Czech Republic
Populated places in Strakonice District
Prácheňsko